El Centro Elementary School District is a public school district based in Imperial County, California, United States.

External links
 

School districts in Imperial County, California